Akira Satō is the name of:

, Japanese photographer
, Japanese ski jumper
 Akira Satō (politician) (born 1951), Japanese politician
 Akira Sato (director) (born unknown), employed at Yamaha Motor Company, Shizuka, Japan

Fictional characters:
 Akira Satou of Katawa Shoujo